The World Group II was the second highest level of Fed Cup competition in 2009. Winning nations advanced to the World Group Play-offs, and the losing nations were demoted to the World Group II Play-offs.

Slovakia vs. Belgium

Switzerland vs. Germany

Serbia vs. Japan

Ukraine vs. Israel

References

See also
Fed Cup structure

World II